Moon Lok Dai Ha is a public housing estate in Tsuen Wan, New Territories, Hong Kong located at the reclaimed land between Sha Tsui Road and Hoi Pa Street and near Fuk Loi Estate. It comprises four blocks of 11-storey buildings built in 1964 and 1965 by Hong Kong Housing Society, offering a total of 968 units.

Background
Its name, "Moon Lok Dai Ha", means "a building filled with happiness" in Chinese language. Rehabilitation works in the estate started in 2004 and finished in 2006.

Houses

Politics
Moon Lok Dai Ha is located in Clague Garden constituency of the Tsuen Wan District Council. It was formerly represented by Chan Kim-kam, who was elected in the 2019 elections until July 2021.

See also

Public housing estates in Tsuen Wan

References

Tsuen Wan
Public housing estates in Hong Kong